The Sibuyan shrew (Crocidura ninoyi) is a species of shrew from the Philippines.

References

ninoyi
Mammals of the Philippines
Mammals described in 2010
Endemic fauna of the Philippines
Fauna of Romblon